Manucho is an old Germanic first name.

As a nickname, Manucho may refer to:

People with the nickname 

 Manuel Mujica Láinez (1910–1984), Argentine fiction writer and art critic
 Manucho Gonçalves (born 1983), Angolan footballer
 Fabrice Elysée Kouadio Kouakou (born 1990), Ivorian footballer
 Manucho Barros (born 1986), Angolan International footballer, plays for Interclube in Girabola
 Manucho Diniz (born 1986), Angolan footballer who plays as a midfielder for Primeiro de Agosto

See also 

Manuel (disambiguation)

References 

Germanic given names